En defensa Propia ("In Self Defence") is a 1917 Mexican film directed by Joaquín Coss. It stars Mimí Derba, María Caballé and Julio Taboada.

External links
 

1917 films
Mexican silent films
1917 drama films
Mexican black-and-white films
Mexican drama films
Silent drama films